The spectrum of a linear operator  that operates on a Banach space  is a fundamental concept of functional analysis. The spectrum has a standard decomposition into three parts: 

 a continuous spectrum, consisting of the scalars that are not eigenvalues but make the range of  a proper dense subset of the space;
 a residual spectrum, consisting of all other scalars in the spectrum.

This decomposition is relevant to the study of differential equations, and has applications to many branches of science and engineering. A well-known example from quantum mechanics is the explanation for the discrete spectral lines and the continuous band in the light emitted by excited atoms of hydrogen.

Decomposition into point spectrum, continuous spectrum, and residual spectrum

For bounded Banach space operators 

By definition, a complex number λ is in the spectrum of T, denoted σ(T), if  does not have an inverse in B(X).

If  is one-to-one and onto, i.e. bijective, then its inverse is bounded; this follows directly from the open mapping theorem of functional analysis.  So, λ is in the spectrum of T if and only if  is not one-to-one or not onto. One distinguishes three separate cases:

 is not injective.  That is, there exist two distinct elements x,y in X such that . Then  is a non-zero vector such that .  In other words, λ is an eigenvalue of T in the sense of linear algebra.  In this case, λ is said to be in the point spectrum of T, denoted .
 is injective, and its range is a dense subset  R of X; but is not the whole of X.  In other words, there exists some element x in X such that  can be as close to x as desired, with y in X; but is never equal to x.  It can be proved that, in this case,  is not bounded below (i.e. it sends far apart elements of X too close together).  Equivalently, the inverse linear operator , which is defined on the dense subset R, is not a bounded operator, and therefore cannot be extended to the whole of X.  Then λ is said to be in the continuous spectrum, of T.
 is injective but does not have dense range.  That is, there is some element x in X and a neighborhood N of x such that  is never in N. In this case, the map  may be bounded or unbounded, but in any case does not admit a unique extension to a bounded linear map on all of X.  Then λ is said to be in the residual spectrum of T, .

So σ(T) is the disjoint union of these three sets,

In addition, when  does not have dense range, whether is injective or not, then λ is said to be in the compression spectrum of T, σcp(T). The compression spectrum consists of the whole residual spectrum and part of point spectrum.

For unbounded operators 
The spectrum of an unbounded operator can be divided into three parts in the same way as in the bounded case, but because the operator is not defined everywhere, the definitions of domain, inverse, etc. are more involved.

Examples

Multiplication operator 

Given a σ-finite measure space (S, Σ, μ), consider the Banach space Lp(μ). A function h: S → C is called essentially bounded if h is bounded μ-almost everywhere. An essentially bounded h induces a bounded multiplication operator Th on Lp(μ):

The operator norm of T is the essential supremum of h. The essential range of h is defined in the following way: a complex number λ is in the essential range of h if for all ε > 0, the preimage of the open ball Bε(λ) under h has strictly positive measure. We will show first that σ(Th) coincides with the essential range of h and then examine its various parts.

If λ is not in the essential range of h, take ε > 0 such that h−1(Bε(λ)) has zero measure. The function g(s) = 1/(h(s) − λ) is bounded almost everywhere by 1/ε. The multiplication operator Tg satisfies . So λ does not lie in spectrum of Th.  On the other hand, if λ lies in the essential range of h, consider the sequence of sets . Each Sn has positive measure. Let fn be the characteristic function of Sn. We can compute directly

This shows  is not bounded below, therefore not invertible.

If λ is such that μ( h−1({λ})) > 0, then λ lies in the point spectrum of Th as follows. Let f be the characteristic function of the measurable set h−1(λ), then by considering two cases, we find

so λ is an eigenvalue of Th.

Any λ in the essential range of h that does not have a positive measure preimage is in the continuous spectrum of Th. To show this, we must show that  has dense range. Given , again we  consider the sequence of sets . Define

Then by the dominated convergence theorem,

in the Lp(μ) norm.

Therefore, multiplication operators have no residual spectrum. In particular, by the spectral theorem, normal operators on a Hilbert space have no residual spectrum.

Shifts 

In the special case when S is the set of natural numbers and μ is the counting measure, the corresponding Lp(μ) is denoted by lp. This space consists of complex valued sequences {xn} such that

For 1 < p < ∞, l p is reflexive. Define the left shift T : l p → l p by

T is a partial isometry with operator norm 1. So σ(T) lies in the closed unit disk of the complex plane.

T* is the right shift (or unilateral shift), which is an isometry on l q, where 1/p + 1/q = 1:

For λ ∈ C with |λ| < 1,

and T x = λ x. Consequently, the point spectrum of T contains the open unit disk. Now, T* has no eigenvalues, i.e. σp(T*) is empty. Thus, invoking reflexivity and the theorem given above (that σp(T)  ⊂ σr(T*) ∪ σp(T*)), we can deduce that the open unit disk lies in the residual spectrum of T*.

The spectrum of a bounded operator is closed, which implies the unit circle, { |λ| = 1 } ⊂ C, is in σ(T). Again by reflexivity of l p and the theorem given above (this time, that ), we have that σr(T) is also empty. Therefore, for a complex number λ with unit norm, one must have λ ∈  σp(T) or λ ∈ σc(T). Now if |λ| = 1 and

then

which cannot be in l p, a contradiction. This means the unit circle must lie in the continuous spectrum of T.

So for the left shift T, σp(T) is the open unit disk and σc(T) is the unit circle, whereas for the right shift T*, σr(T*) is the open unit disk and σc(T*) is the unit circle.

For p = 1, one can perform a similar analysis.  The results will not be exactly the same, since reflexivity no longer holds.

Self-adjoint operators on Hilbert space 

Hilbert spaces are Banach spaces, so the above discussion applies to bounded operators on Hilbert spaces as well. A subtle point concerns the spectrum of T*. For a Banach space, T* denotes the transpose and  σ(T*) = σ(T). For a Hilbert space, T* normally denotes the adjoint of an operator T ∈ B(H), not the transpose, and σ(T*) is not σ(T) but rather its image under complex conjugation.

For a self-adjoint T ∈ B(H), the Borel functional calculus gives additional ways to break up the spectrum naturally.

Borel functional calculus 

This subsection briefly sketches the development of this calculus.  The idea is to first establish the continuous functional calculus, and then pass to measurable functions via the Riesz–Markov–Kakutani representation theorem. For the continuous functional calculus, the key ingredients are the following:

 If T is self-adjoint, then for any polynomial P, the operator norm satisfies 
 The Stone–Weierstrass theorem, which implies that the family of polynomials (with complex coefficients), is dense in C(σ(T)), the continuous functions on σ(T).

The family C(σ(T)) is a Banach algebra when endowed with the uniform norm. So the mapping

is an isometric homomorphism from a dense subset of C(σ(T)) to B(H). Extending the mapping by continuity gives f(T) for f ∈ C(σ(T)): let Pn be polynomials such that Pn → f uniformly and define f(T) = lim  Pn(T). This is the continuous functional calculus.

For a fixed h ∈ H, we notice that

is a positive linear functional on C(σ(T)). According to the Riesz–Markov–Kakutani representation theorem a unique measure μh on σ(T) exists such that

This measure is sometimes called the spectral measure associated to h. The spectral measures can be used to extend the continuous functional calculus to bounded Borel functions. For a bounded function g that is Borel measurable, define, for a proposed g(T)

Via the polarization identity, one can recover (since H is assumed to be complex)

and therefore g(T) h for arbitrary h.

In the present context, the spectral measures, combined with a result from measure theory, give a decomposition of σ(T).

Decomposition into absolutely continuous, singular continuous, and pure point 

Let h ∈ H and μh be its corresponding spectral measure on σ(T) ⊂ R. According to a refinement of Lebesgue's decomposition theorem, μh can be decomposed into three mutually singular parts:

where μac is absolutely continuous with respect to the Lebesgue measure, μsc is singular with respect to the Lebesgue measure and atomless, and μpp is a pure point measure.

All three types of measures are invariant under linear operations. Let Hac be the subspace consisting of vectors whose spectral measures are absolutely continuous with respect to the Lebesgue measure. Define Hpp and Hsc in analogous fashion.  These subspaces are invariant under T. For example, if h ∈ Hac and k = T h. Let χ be the characteristic function of some Borel set in σ(T), then

So

and k ∈ Hac. Furthermore, applying the spectral theorem gives

This leads to the following definitions:

The spectrum of T restricted to Hac is called the absolutely continuous spectrum of T, σac(T).
The spectrum of T restricted to Hsc is called its singular spectrum, σsc(T).
The set of eigenvalues of T is called the pure point spectrum of T, σpp(T).

The closure of the eigenvalues is the spectrum of T restricted to Hpp. So

Comparison 

A bounded self-adjoint operator on Hilbert space is, a fortiori, a bounded operator on a Banach space. Therefore, one can also apply to T the decomposition of the spectrum that was achieved above for bounded operators on a Banach space. Unlike the Banach space formulation, the union

need not be disjoint. It is disjoint when the operator T is of uniform multiplicity, say m, i.e. if T is unitarily equivalent to multiplication by λ on the direct sum

for some Borel measures . When more than one measure appears in the above expression, we see that it is possible for the union of the three types of spectra to not be disjoint. If , λ is sometimes called an eigenvalue embedded in the absolutely continuous spectrum.

When T is unitarily equivalent to multiplication by λ on

the decomposition of σ(T) from Borel functional calculus is a refinement of the Banach space case.

Physics 

The preceding comments can be extended to the unbounded self-adjoint operators since Riesz-Markov holds for locally compact Hausdorff spaces.

In quantum mechanics, observables are self-adjoint operators, often not bounded, and their spectra are the possible outcomes of measurements. Absolutely continuous spectrum of a physical observable corresponds to free states of a system, while the pure point spectrum corresponds to bound states.  The singular spectrum correspond to physically impossible outcomes.  An example of a quantum mechanical observable which has purely continuous spectrum is the position operator of a free particle moving on a line. Its spectrum is the entire real line. Also, since the momentum operator is unitarily equivalent to the position operator, via the Fourier transform, they have the same spectrum.

Intuition may induce one to say that the discreteness of the spectrum is intimately related to the corresponding states being "localized". However, a careful mathematical analysis shows that this is not true.

However, the phenomena of Anderson localization and dynamical localization describe, when the eigenfunctions are localized in a physical sense. Dynamical localization is more subtle to define.

Sometimes, when performing physical quantum mechanical calculations, one encounters "eigenvectors" that do not lie in L2(R), i.e. wave functions that are not localized.  These are the free states of the system.  As stated above, in the mathematical formulation, the free states correspond to the absolutely continuous spectrum. Alternatively, if it is insisted that the notion of eigenvectors and eigenvalues survive the passage to the rigorous, one can consider operators on rigged Hilbert spaces.

It was believed for some time that singular spectrum is something artificial. However, examples as the almost Mathieu operator and random Schrödinger operators have shown, that all types of spectra arise naturally in physics.

Decomposition into essential spectrum and discrete spectrum 

Let  be a closed operator defined on the domain  which is dense in X. Then there is a decomposition of the spectrum of A into a disjoint union,

where
  is the fifth type of the essential spectrum of A (if A is a self-adjoint operator, then  for all );
  is the discrete spectrum of A, which consists of normal eigenvalues, or, equivalently, of isolated points of  such that the corresponding Riesz projector has a finite rank.

See also 
 Point spectrum, the set of eigenvalues.
 Essential spectrum, spectrum of an operator modulo compact perturbations.
 Discrete spectrum (mathematics), the set of normal eigenvalues.
 Spectral theory of normal C*-algebras
 Spectrum (functional analysis)

References 

 N. Dunford and J.T. Schwartz, Linear Operators, Part I: General Theory, Interscience, 1958.
 M. Reed and B. Simon, Methods of Modern Mathematical Physics I: Functional Analysis, Academic Press, 1972.

Spectral theory